This is a list of the weapons of Denmark during World War II. You are welcome to put down weapons used by the resistance and after the successful invasion but put them under a different section title to differentiate them.

Small arms

Side arms 

 Bergmann–Bayard M1910/21 pistol
Danish 1865/97 revolver
Danish M1880/85 Army revolver
Mauser C96
FN Model 1910
FN Model 1922
Walther PP/K
Smith & Wesson Model 10
Browning Hi-Power
Welrod

Rifles 

 Danish 1889 Krag–Jørgensen
 Swedish Mauser M96
 Automatgevar M42
 Mauser Karabiner 98k
 Lee-Enfield
 M1917 Enfield
 M1 Garand
 M1 carbine
 Sjögren

SMG 

 Sten Mk2
 Suomi KP/-31
 Lettet-Forsogs
 MP38

Machine guns 

 Madsen machine gun
 Browning M1919

Artillery

Field Artillery 

 Krupp 7.5 cm Model 1903
 Canon de 105 modèle 1930 Schneider

Heavy Artillery 

 Schneider 149 mm Obusier Modele 1929

Anti-tank guns 

 Madsen 20 mm cannon
 Bofors 37 mm anti-tank gun

Armoured fighting vehicles

Light tanks 

 Fiat 3000(1 not operational)

Armoured cars 

 L180
 Landsverk L-185(1 for training)
 Pansarbil m/39

References

Denmark